The songs of Des Knaben Wunderhorn (The Boy’s Magic Horn) by Gustav Mahler are voice-and-piano and voice-and-orchestra settings of German folk poems chosen from a collection of the same name assembled by Achim von Arnim and Clemens Brentano and published by them, in heavily redacted form, between 1805 and 1808.

Ten songs set for soprano or baritone and orchestra were first published by Mahler as a cycle in 1905, but in total 12 orchestral songs exist, and a similar number of songs for voice and piano.

History of composition
Mahler's self-composed text for the first of his Lieder eines fahrenden Gesellen (Songs of a Travelling Journeyman, often translated as Songs of a Wayfarer; 1884–1885) is clearly based on the Wunderhorn poem "Wenn mein Schatz"; his first genuine settings of Wunderhorn texts, however, are found in the Lieder und Gesänge ('Songs and Airs'), published in 1892 and later renamed by the publisher as Lieder und Gesänge aus der Jugendzeit (Songs and Airs from Days of Youth). The nine Wunderhorn settings therein were composed between 1887 and 1890, and occupied the second and third volumes of this three-volume collection of songs for voice and piano. The titles of these nine songs (different in many cases from the titles of the original poems) are as follows:

Volume II
 "Um schlimme Kinder artig zu machen" – To Teach Naughty Children to be Good
 "Ich ging mit Lust durch einen grünen Wald" – I Went Happily Through a Green Wood
 "Aus! Aus!" – Finished! Finished!
 "Starke Einbildungskraft" – Strong Imagination

Volume III
 "Zu Straßburg auf der Schanz" – On the Ramparts of Strasbourg
 "Ablösung im Sommer" – The Changing of the Guard in Summer 
 "Scheiden und Meiden" – Farewell and Forgo
 "Nicht wiedersehen!" – Never to Meet Again
 "Selbstgefühl" – Self-assurance

Mahler began work on his next group of Wunderhorn settings in 1892. A collection of 12 of these was published in 1899, under the title Humoresken ('Humoresques'), and formed the basis of what is now known simply (and somewhat confusingly) as Mahler's 'Songs from "Des Knaben Wunderhorn"'. Whereas the songs in the Lieder und Gesänge collection were conceived for voice and piano, with no orchestral versions being produced by the composer, the Humoresken were conceived from the beginning as being for voice and orchestra, even though Mahler's first step was the production of playable and publishable voice-and-piano versions. The titles in this 1899 collection are:

 "Der Schildwache Nachtlied" – The Sentinel's Nightsong (January–February 1892)
 "Verlor'ne Müh" – Labour Lost (February 1892)
 "Trost im Unglück" – Solace in Misfortune (April 1892)
 "Wer hat dies Liedlein erdacht?" – Who Thought Up This Song? (April 1892)
 "Das irdische Leben" – Earthly Life (after April 1892)
 "Des Antonius von Padua Fischpredigt" – St. Anthony of Padua's Sermon to the Fish (July–August 1893)
 "Rheinlegendchen" – Little Rhine Legend (August 1893)
 "Lied des Verfolgten im Turm" – Song of the Persecuted in the Tower (July 1898), see: Die Gedanken sind frei
 "Wo die schönen Trompeten blasen" – Where the Fair Trumpets Sound (July 1898)
 "Lob des hohen Verstandes" – Praise of Lofty Intellect (June 1896)
 "Es sungen drei Engel" – Three Angels Sang a Sweet Air (1895)
 "Urlicht" – Primeval Light (1893)

"Urlicht" (composed ?1892, orch. July 1893) was rapidly incorporated (with expanded orchestration) into Symphony No. 2 (1888–1894) as the work's fourth movement; "Es sungen drei Engel", by contrast, was specifically composed as part of Symphony No. 3 (1893–1896): requiring a boys' chorus and a women's chorus in addition to an alto soloist, it is the only song among the twelve for which Mahler did not produce a voice-and-orchestra version and the only one which he did not first publish separately. Other songs found themselves serving symphonic ends in other ways: a voiceless version of "Des Antonius von Padua Fischpredigt" forms the basis of the scherzo in Symphony No. 2, and "Ablösung im Sommer" is adopted in the same way by Symphony No. 3. 

An additional setting from this period was "Das himmlische Leben" ("Heavenly Life"), of February 1892 (orchestrated March 1892). By the year of the collection's publication (1899) this song had been reorchestrated and earmarked as the finale of the 4th Symphony (1899–1900), and thus was not published as part of the Des Knaben Wunderhorn collection, nor was it made available in a voice-and-piano version.

After 1901, "Urlicht" and "Es sungen drei Engel" were removed from the collection, and replaced in later editions by two other songs, thus restoring the total number of songs in the set to twelve. The two new songs were:

 "Revelge" – Reveille (July 1899)
 "Der Tamboursg'sell" – The Drummer Boy (August 1901)

Shortly after Mahler's death, the publisher (Universal Edition) replaced Mahler's own piano versions of the Wunderhorn songs by piano reductions of the orchestral versions, thus obscuring the differences in Mahler's writing for the two media. In spite of this, voice-and-piano performances, especially of the lighter songs, are frequent.

Arrangement for chamber ensemble
In 2012, Ensemble Mini commissioned (as part of its "mini-Mahler series") composer and arranger Klaus Simon to transcribe the songs for a chamber ensemble of 16 musicians, the premiere of which was performed at Berliner Philharmonie on 20 June 2012. It is also published by Universal Edition.

Other composers
Poems from the same collection have also been set as Lieder by several composers, including Mendelssohn, Schumann, Loewe, Brahms, Schoenberg, Webern, and Zemlinsky.

Discography
 Rheinlegendchen: Frederica von Stade and the London Philharmonic Orchestra, conducted by Andrew Davis, Columbia, 1979
 Wer hat dies Liedlein erdacht?: Frederica von Stade and the London Philharmonic Orchestra, conducted by Andrew Davis, Columbia, 1979

References

External links 
 The German lyrics, with many translations to other languages at The LiederNet Archive
 Radio talk in which Deryck Cooke discusses the relationship between 'Des Knaben Wunderhorn' and Mahler's Fourth Symphony

Song cycles by Gustav Mahler
Compositions by Gustav Mahler
Lieder